Jagadam is a 2007 Indian Telugu-language action film written and directed by Sukumar. The film stars Ram, Isha Sahani, Pradeep Rawat, and Prakash Raj. The film was produced by Aditya Babu. The film was released on 16 March 2007. Though the film failed at Box Office, Over the years, the film eventually gained cult following for its concept, screenplay & direction and it is regarded as one of the best films of Sukumar.

Plot 
Seenu enjoys fights since his childhood. He appreciates violence and wants to be like Manikyam, a goonda, as everyone, including his teacher, is afraid of him. When all the boys wanted to become engineers, doctors, lawyers, and other professions, Seenu wanted to become a goonda. Though he behaves like a ruffian, he learns that one should have the support of a politician or big dada. With the help of Laddu, an associate of Manikyam, Seenu meets the latter and joins his gang. At this juncture, Seenu falls in love with Subbalakshmi. As she pleads with Seenu to help her friend's father, Seenu agrees to settle a land deal, but the land was under illegal occupation of Manikyam's gang member. As he promised to settle the deal, Seenu opposes Manikyam. This makes Seenu a hero, and he starts doing settlements on his own. Once, he agrees to help an industrialist, whose quarry was occupied by Yadav, with Manikyam's support. As things go out of control, Seenu decides to kill Yadav but could not. However, Seenu's young brother, who also likes fighting scenes, takes a gun and shoots Yadav. Seenu appeals to the police commissioner to mediate with Manikyam, but his men kill Seenu's brother. This irks Seenu, who thrashes Manikyam but spares him. He realizes that violence is not the way to go. When Manikyam attacks him, he kills him in self-defense. The film ends on a happy note with Seenu leaving all the dadagiri and leading a normal life.

Cast 

 Ram as Macha Srinivas "Seenu"
 Isha Sahani as Subbalakshmi "Seenu", Seenu's girlfriend
 Pradeep Rawat as Manikyam
 Prakash Raj as Police Commissioner (cameo)
 A. S. Ravikumar Chowdary as Laddu
 Satya Prakash as Yadav
 Raghu Babu as Macha Balram, Seenu's father
 Saranya as Seenu's mother
 Nalla Venu as Nalla Mallesh, Seenu's friend
 Dhanraj as Nampalli Satti, Seenu's friend
 Thagubothu Ramesh as Seenu's friend
 Chitram Seenu as Vaali, Seenu's friend
 Tanikella Bharani as PVR, MLA
 Narsing Yadav as Police Officer
 Telangana Shakuntala as Corporator
 Duvvasi Mohan as Jaffer Anna
 Jogi Krishnan Raju as Journalist Sattibabu
 Venu Madhav
 Prudhviraj
 Zabyn Khan as item number in the song "Mu Mu Mudhante Chedha"
 Antara Biswas as an item number in the song "36-24-36"
 Madhu Shalini as item number in the song "36-24-36"

Soundtrack
The film has six songs composed by Devi Sri Prasad. Music got a good response from public.

Reception 
The film received mixed reviews. Sify gave the film three stars out of five, calling Jagadam a "not a plot driven film." While praising the film for its cinematography and music, the reviewer criticized its weak script and lackluster characters. Rediff.com, however, appreciated Sukamar's screenplay and direction. Idlebrain.com, while commending Sukumar for taking up a different theme, criticized the film for a slow-paced second half and a weak climax.

References

External links
 

2007 films
2000s Telugu-language films
Indian action films
Films about organised crime in India
2007 action films
Films directed by Sukumar
Films scored by Devi Sri Prasad